The League Leaders' Shield is a shield awarded to the team finishing the season top of Super League in the sport of rugby league football. Currently, and for most of Super League's history, the championship is decided on the basis of a play-off series with a Grand Final, so the Shield is regarded as a lesser prize.

History
From 1907 until 1973 the Championship was awarded to the team winning a top-four play-off (excluding the 2 seasons 1962–63 and 1963–64, when the championship was awarded to the top-placed team). From 1907 to 1962 no prize was awarded to the team finishing top. From 1965 to 1973 a 'League Leaders' Trophy' was introduced to reward the team finishing top. In 1996, Super League was formed but continued to use the league to decide the champions until 1998, when they adopted a play-off structure for the championship. 

The League Leaders' Shield was first awarded in 2003. Between 1998 and 2002 the league leaders were not awarded a trophy. In 1996 and 1997 the League Leaders were declared champions as the Grand Final was not introduced until 1998.

In 2015, it was announced that the League Leaders would qualify to take part in the expanded World Club Challenge and the prize money would be inecreased from £50,000 to £100,000. In 2016, the League Leaders were awarded medals for the first time.

Shield winners 

a: Shield winners decided by win percentage rather than points

Winners

The Treble

The Treble refers to the team who wins all three domestic honours on offer during the season; Grand Final, League Leaders' Shield and Challenge Cup. To date six teams have won the treble, and only Bradford Bulls, St. Helens and Leeds Rhinos have won the treble in the Super League era.

See also

Championship Leaders' Shield
Super League Grand Final
Minor premiership - Australian equivalent

References

External links

Rugby league competitions in the United Kingdom
Rugby league trophies and awards